Charing Cross is the second tram stop in Bendigo, Victoria, Australia, on the Vintage 'Talking' Tram network which is operated by Bendigo Tramways, under the supervision of The Bendigo Trust.

History
The Charing Cross Tram Stop was opened to the public upon the commencement of trams in Bendigo in 1890. Charing Cross remained the central-hub for trams for 82 years, until the closure of the former SEC Bendigo public tramways on 16 April 1972. On 9 December 1972, after much support from the local people of Bendigo, the State Government of Victoria and the City of Greater Bendigo Council, the former Charing Cross - Golden Square tramway was shortened and altered, to provide a tourist tram service between the Bendigo Joss House Temple at the North Bendigo Terminus and the Central Deborah Gold Mine at the Violet Street Terminus. Today, Charing Cross remains the City Centre and possibly the most used tram stop in Bendigo.

Facilities
Charing Cross consists of a tram shelter.

References

Trams in Bendigo
Tram stops
Bendigo